

Richard John (21 June 1896 – 19 February 1965) was a German general during World War II who commanded several divisions. He was a recipient of the Knight's Cross of the Iron Cross.

Awards and decorations

 Knight's Cross of the Iron Cross on 20 December 1943 as Generalmajor and commander of 292. Infanterie-Division

References

Citations

Bibliography

 

1896 births
1965 deaths
People from Wilhelmshaven
Lieutenant generals of the German Army (Wehrmacht)
German Army personnel of World War I
Recipients of the clasp to the Iron Cross, 1st class
Recipients of the Gold German Cross
Recipients of the Knight's Cross of the Iron Cross
German prisoners of war in World War II
People from the Province of Hanover
Reichswehr personnel
Military personnel from Lower Saxony